Sergei Viktorovich Kolotovkin (born 28 September 1965, in Magnitogorsk) is a retired Soviet and Russian football player and coach. He last worked as the manager of the Russian Second Division club FC Reutov.

Club career
Kolotovkin played in the Soviet Top League (and later, Russian Top League) with FC Zenit Leningrad, PFC CSKA Moscow, FC Dynamo Moscow, FC Tyumen and Rostelmash Rostov. He played in 157 league matches before he scored his first goal (for Rostelmash in May 1999).

Honours
 Soviet Union championship winner: 1991.
 Soviet Union cup winner: 1991.

International career
Kolotovkin played his first game for Russia on 16 August 1992 in a friendly against Mexico.

References

External links 
  Profile

1965 births
Living people
Soviet footballers
Russian footballers
Russia international footballers
Russian expatriate footballers
FC Zenit Saint Petersburg players
PFC CSKA Moscow players
Beitar Jerusalem F.C. players
Hapoel Tzafririm Holon F.C. players
Expatriate footballers in Israel
FC Dynamo Moscow players
FC Tyumen players
FC Rostov players
FC Sodovik Sterlitamak players
Soviet Top League players
Russian Premier League players
Association football defenders
Russian expatriate sportspeople in Israel
People from Magnitogorsk
Sportspeople from Chelyabinsk Oblast